Purley & Woodcote is a ward in the London Borough of Croydon. It is created from parts of Purley and Coulsdon West wards. The ward's first election is 3 May 2018.

List of Councillors

Mayoral election results 
Below are the results for the candidate which received the highest share of the popular vote in the ward at each mayoral election.

Ward Result

References 

Wards of the London Borough of Croydon